The Bunty Lawless Stakes is a Thoroughbred horse race run annually at Woodbine Racetrack in Toronto, Canada. An Ontario Sire Stakes, it is a race for horses age three and older. Run near the end of October, it is contested over a distance of 1 mile (8 furlongs) on turf and currently carries a purse of $96,563.

Inaugurated in 1975, it is named in honor of Canadian Horse Racing Hall of Fame inductee, Bunty Lawless (1935–1956) who, in a 1951 poll conducted by Canadian Press, was voted "Canadian Horse of the Half Century."

In 2006 the race was run at a distance of 8 furlongs and 70 yards on Polytrack.

Records
Speed  record: 

Most wins:
 3 – Rahy's Attorney (2007, 2009, 2010)
 2 – Frost King (1981, 1982)
 2 – Balafran (1984, 1985)
 2 – Control Zone (1989, 1990)
 2 – Steady Ruckus (2000, 2002)
 2 – Tusayan (2003, 2005)
 2 – Pender Harbour (2011, 2012)

Most wins by an owner:
 2 – Ted Smith/Bill Marko (1981, 1982)
 2 – Bala Glen Farm (1984, 1985)
 2 – Kinghaven Farms (1989, 1990)
 2 – Edward Lang (2000, 2002)
 2 – Srinivas Kilambi/Laurie Silvera (2003, 2005)
 2 – Giffin/Andrews/Lazaruk (2011, 2012)

Most wins by a jockey:
 3 – Robin Platts (1976, 1980, 1992)
 3 – Lloyd Duffy (1981, 1982, 1991)
 3 – Luis Contreras (2011, 2012, 2015)

Most wins by a trainer:
 3 – Roger Attfield (1980, 1989, 1990)

Winners

References
 The Bunty Lawless Stakes at Pedigree Query
 Woodbine Racetrack

Ungraded stakes races in Canada
Open mile category horse races
Turf races in Canada
Woodbine Racetrack
Recurring sporting events established in 1975